Tobias Bech Kristensen (born 2 February 2002) is a Danish professional footballer who plays as a winger for  club FC Ingolstadt 04.

Career
Bech started playing football at the age of four and played for a few clubs, before joining Viborg FF as a youth player. In August 2015, he scored a hattrick at the age of 15 for the U17's. Later in October, he signed a contract until June 2021 with the club. On 11 March 2018, Bech was noted in the history books when he made his Danish 1st Division debut, making him the youngest player ever to play in the league. Bech was 16 years and 20 days old on his debut. Bech was also the youngest player ever to debut for Viborg FF, taking over the record from his own cousin, Oliver Haurits.

After failing to agree on a contract extension with Viborg, it was confirmed on 5 August 2022 that Bech had been sold to German 3. Liga club FC Ingolstadt 04, signing a contract until June 2025.

Personal life
Bech was diagnosed with ADHD, which prevented him from playing with the Danish youth national teams.

Honours
Viborg
Danish 1st Division: 2020–21

References

External links
 

Living people
2002 births
People from Viborg Municipality
Sportspeople from the Central Denmark Region
Danish men's footballers
Association football wingers
Danish 1st Division players
Danish Superliga players
3. Liga players
Viborg FF players
FC Ingolstadt 04 players
Danish expatriate men's footballers
Danish expatriate sportspeople in Germany
Expatriate footballers in Germany